Voi (núi Voi, núi Ten và núi Cẩn) is a mountain of the Xuân Sơn National Park in Phú Thọ Province in northern Vietnam. It is the highest point in the park at 1347 metres.

References

Mountains of Vietnam
Landforms of Phú Thọ province